Joe or 
 Joseph T. Gregory, paleontologist
 Joseph M. Gregory, banker
 Joseph Gregory (sniper)
 Joe Gregory (trade union leader)